Vaqueiros is a freguesia (parish) in the municipality of Alcoutim (Algarve, Portugal). The population in 2011 was 497, in an area of 143.94 km2.

References

Freguesias of Alcoutim